Freethiel Stadion is a multi-use stadium in Beveren, Belgium.  The Freethiel Stadium, also known as the Freethiel for short, is the football stadium where the Belgian football club SK Beveren (formerly known as Waasland-Beveren) plays its home games. The stadium was originally played by KSK Beveren, when that club temporarily stopped their men's team in 2010, Waasland-Beveren took its place. The whole complex includes 10 football fields and a fitness hall. It is currently used mostly for football matches.  The stadium's name (Freethiel) is a contraction of the name Frederik Thielemans, the man who owned a cycling-track in the Klapperstraat, but made it available to the football club when it was established. The stadium is located in the Klapperstraat in Beveren, and has a capacity of 8,190

Owner of the Freethiel Stadium

The owner of the Freethiel Stadium is the municipality of Beveren, which leaves its use and maintenance to Waasland-Beveren, which replaced KSK Beveren in 2010. On Saturday, September 14, after an agreement with Waasland-Beveren, KSK Beveren played an official match at the Freethiel against neighbor Svelta Melsele for the first time in 12 years. More than a thousand spectators saw KSK Beveren win 1-0.

References

Football venues in Flanders
Sports venues in East Flanders
Beveren